Here on Earth (Spanish: Aquí en la Tierra), is a Mexican political thriller television series created by Gael García Bernal, from a screenplay by Jorge Dorantes, Kyzza Terrazas, and Jacques Bonnavent. The series is produced by La Corriente del Golfo, and Fox Networks Group Latin America. The first season consists of 8 episodes that were produced for eight weeks, at the end of 2017, between Mexico City and Montreal, Canada. The shows is premiered on 20 April 2018 on Fox Premium Latin American, while streaming it premiered on 16 April 2018 through the Fox Play app. It stars García Bernal, Alfonso Dosal, Tenoch Huerta, and Paulina Dávila.

In July 2018, the series was renewed for a second season, which was released on 16 July 2020 through the Fox Play app, and on television on 17 July 2020.

The series was nominated for best series at the 2018 Cannes Film Festival.

Plot 
The series is about the crimes and secrets of one of the most influential families in Mexico, how a humble young man jumps through social barriers to ascend the economic and political ladder, and the awareness of a young heir who fights for clarifying the murder of his father, in a Mexico very similar to the current one, but far from being the same.

Cast 
 Alfonso Dosal as Carlos Calles
 Tenoch Huerta as Adán Cruz
 Paulina Dávila as Elisa Rocha
 Daniel Giménez Cacho as Mario Rocha
 Ariadna Gil as Helena Ogarrio
 Yoshira Escárrega as América Sánchez
 Sofía Sisniega as Julia de la Peña
 Ezequiel Díaz as Juan Pablo Berrondo
 Gael García Bernal as El Pájaro
 Teresa Ruiz as Nadia Basurto
 Guillermo Ríos as Rufino Cruz
 Francisco Barreiro as Óscar Salgado
 Aidan Vallejo as Pato Rocha
 Andrés Almeida as Tinoco

Episodes

Season 1 (2018)

Season 2 (2020)

References

External links 
 

2018 Mexican television series debuts
Spanish-language television shows
Television series about organized crime
Fox Broadcasting Company original programming
Mexican television series
Works about organized crime in Mexico